Spencerian refers to
 the adjective of Spencer (surname), in particular
 Platt Rogers Spencer (1800–64), US business school activist; in particular
 Spencerian script, business handwriting style 
 Spencerian College, for-profit career college in Louisville and Lexington, Kentucky, USA
 Spencerian Business College, various
 Herbert Spencer (1820–1903) social thinker; in particular
 Social Darwinism, application of the biological concepts of natural selection and survival of the fittest to sociology and politics

Similar spelling
 Spenserian (disambiguation)